The Central African Republic is divided into 20 prefectures (14 administrative prefectures and 2 economic prefectures ) and one autonomous commune. The prefectures (préfectures) are further divided into 84 sub-prefectures (sous-préfectures).

Prefectures 

The prefectures consist of the following:
 Bamingui-Bangoran
 Basse-Kotto
 Haute-Kotto
 Haut-Mbomou
 Kémo
 Lobaye
 Lim-Pendé
 Mambéré
 Mambéré-Kadéï
 Mbomou
 Nana-Grébizi
 Nana-Mambéré
 Ombella-M'Poko
 Ouaka
 Ouham
 Ouham-Fafa
 Ouham-Pendé
 Sangha-Mbaéré
 Vakaga

The two economic prefectures are Nana-Grébizi and Sangha-Mbaéré; the special commune and capital city is Bangui.

See also 
 Sub-prefectures of the Central African Republic

References 

 
Central African Republic
Central African Republic